ISO 3166-2:KE is the entry for Kenya in ISO 3166-2, part of the ISO 3166 standard published by the International Organization for Standardization (ISO), which defines codes for the names of the principal subdivisions (e.g., provinces or states) of all countries coded in ISO 3166-1.

Currently for Kenya, ISO 3166-2 codes are defined for 47 counties.

Each code consists of two parts, separated by a hyphen. The second part is two digits.

Current codes
Subdivision names are listed as in the ISO 3166-2 standard published by the ISO 3166 Maintenance Agency (ISO 3166/MA).

ISO 639-1 codes are used to represent subdivision names in the following administrative languages:
 (en): English
 (sw): Swahili

Click on the button in the header to sort each column.

Counties

Changes
The following changes to the entry have been announced by the ISO 3166/MA since the first publication of ISO 3166-2 in 1998.  ISO stopped issuing newsletters in 2013

Former codes

Prior to 2014, the ISO 3166-2 standard maintained codes for the former 8 provinces of Kenya.

Click on the button in the header to sort each column.

See also
 Subdivisions of Kenya
 FIPS region codes of Kenya

References

External links
 ISO Online Browsing Platform: KE
 Provinces of Kenya, Statoids.com

2:KE
ISO 3166-2
Kenya geography-related lists